Wark or WARK may refer to:

Wark (surname), including a list of people with the surname
Wark (river), a river in Luxembourg
WARK (AM), talk radio station in Hagerstown, Maryland
Wark on Tweed, a village in Carham parish, in the north of England bordering Scotland
Wark on Tyne, a village in the north of England near Kielder reservoir

See also

Mar's Wark in Stirling
King's Wark in Leith